Xinluo District (Hakka: Sîn-lò-khî) is a district of Longyan, Fujian Province, China, with a population of approximately 842,000.

It was formerly named Longyan County.

As Xinluo is a part of the Minnan Hokkien territory, the Longyan dialect is spoken widely by the native Hokkien locals in the district, but Mandarin is the primary language for education and business.

Administrative divisions
Ten subdistricts:

 Beicheng Subdistrict
 Caoxi Subdistrict
 Dongcheng Subdistrict – Seat of the Xinluo District People's Government
 Dongxiao Subdistrict
 Longmen Subdistrict
 Nancheng Subdistrict
 Tieshan Subdistrict
 Xicheng Subdistrict
 Xipi Subdistrict – Seat of the Longyan City People's Government
 Zhongcheng Subdistrict

Ten towns:

 Baisha
 Dachi
 Hongfang
 Jiangshan
 Shizhong
 Suban
 Wan'an
 Xiaochi
 Yanshan
 Yanshi

Transportation
The area is served by Longyan railway station.

References

External links
 Official website of the Xinluo District People's Government
 Fujian population statistics

County-level divisions of Fujian
Longyan